Helluva Band is the second album by the rock band Angel.

Track listing
"Feelin' Right" – 4:42 (Frank DiMino, Punky Meadows, Gregg Giuffria)
"The Fortune" – 8:40 (DiMino, Meadows, Giuffria)
"Anyway You Want It" – 2:52 (DiMino, Meadows, Giuffria)
"Dr. Ice" – 5:23 (Derek Lawrence, DiMino, Meadows, Giuffria)
"Mirrors" – 4:28 (DiMino, Meadows, Giuffria)
"Feelings" – 5:42 (DiMino, Meadows, Giuffria)
"Pressure Point" – 5:26 (Barry Brandt, Mickie Jones, DiMino, Meadows)
"Chicken Soup" – 4:46 (DiMino, Meadows, Giuffria)
"Angel Theme" – 2:32 (Giuffria, Brandt) 

The Rock Candy Records reissue features a hidden track after "Angel Theme" - a rare Japanese fan club greeting/recording by the band members in anticipation of going to Japan for the first time.

Personnel
Frank DiMino: all vocals
Punky Meadows: all guitars
Gregg Giuffria: organ, piano, clavinet, harpsichord, Mellotron, synthesizers, ARP string ensemble (Moog programming by Dan Wyman & Jim Cypherd for Sound Arts)
Mickie Jones: bass guitar
Barry Brandt: drums, percussion

Production
Arranged by Angel
Produced by Derek Lawrence & Big Jim Sullivan
Recorded & mixed by Peter Granet; Tape Operator: David Geuta
Mastered by Allen Zentz

References

1976 albums
Angel (band) albums
Albums produced by Derek Lawrence
Casablanca Records albums